The 1976 Metropolitan Borough Council election for the City of Wolverhampton Council in Wolverhampton, England, were held on 6 May.

The Labour Party retained control of the council.

The composition of the council prior to the election was:

Labour 38
Conservative 21
Wolverhampton Association of Ratepayers 1

The composition of the council following the election was:

Labour 34
Conservative 24
Wolverhampton Association of Ratepayers 2

Election results

WAR gain from Labour

External links

1976
1976 English local elections
1970s in the West Midlands (county)
May 1976 events in the United Kingdom